Astrakhan District is a district of Aqmola Region in northern Kazakhstan. The administrative center of the district is the Village of Astrakhanka. Population:

References

Districts of Kazakhstan
Akmola Region